This is a list of animated films in Mexico. Below also lists the ten highest-grossing animated films within the Mexican film industry.

List

1970s

1980s

2000s

2010s

2020s

Upcoming

Lost or unreleased

Highest-grossing films
The following list consists the 10 highest-grossing Mexican animated feature films released in Mexico, based on data by Canacine (unless otherwise noted). Gross in Mexican peso and audience count (both in millions).

See also
List of highest-grossing Mexican films

References

Mexican animated films
Mexican animated films
Animated